This list includes the theaters of Ukraine as of spring 2010 in accordance with the current administrative division of the state. This list, though incomplete, includes both state theaters (possibly all) and folk, as well as private.

Theatres

Kyiv 
State-owned
 National Opera of Ukraine
 Ivan Franko National Academic Drama Theater
 Lesia Ukrainka National Academic Theater
 Kyiv National Academic Theatre of Operetta
Municipally-owned
 Kyiv Municipal Academic Opera and Ballet Theatre for Children and Youth
Community-owned
 Kyiv National Academic Molodyy Theatre
 Kyiv Academic Puppet Theatre
 Kyiv Municipal Academic Puppet Theater
 Kyiv Academic Theater for Young Spectators on Lipskaia Street
 Kyiv Academic Drama Theater in Podil
 Kyiv Academic Theatre of Drama and Comedy on the left bank of Dnieper
 Actor Theater
 Kyiv Puppet Theater
 Kyiv Academic Theater Workshop "Constellation"
 Kyiv Academic Theater "Koleso"
 Kyiv Gypsy Theater "Romance"
 Kyiv Academic Theatre of Ukrainian Folklore
 Ukrainian Small Drama Theater
 New Theatre on Pechersk
 Kyiv Academic Theater "Golden Gate"

 Beyond the sphere of management of the Ministry of Culture of Ukraine
 PostPlay
 Kyiv Drama Theater "Bravo"
 Dakh Theatre - Centre of Contemporary Arts
 Theater of Ukrainian Tradition "Dzerkalo"
 Theatre «Dyvnyy Zamok»
 Wild Theater
 Mykola Rushkovsky's Theater Workshop
 Youth Interactive Modern Theatre "Mist"
 Volodymyr Zavalnyuk's "Transformation" Theater
 Arts Center "New Ukrainian Theatre" on Mikhailovskaia Street
 Kyiv Millennium Theater
 Black Square Improvisation Theater-Studio

Sevastopol 

 Sevastopol Academic Russian Drama Theater named after A.V. Lunacharsky
 Theater for children and youth "On the Great Sea"
 Russian Drama Theater of the Black Sea Fleet named after V.A. Lavrenov
 Sevastopol Dance Theater under the direction of VA Elizarov

Autonomous Republic of Crimea

Simferopol 

 Crimean Academic Russian Drama Theater named after Maxim Gorky
 Crimean Tatar Academic Music and Drama Theater
 Crimean Academic Ukrainian Musical Theater
 Crimean Academic Puppet Theater
 Simferopol Variety Ballet Theater "Phoenix"

Yevpatoria 

 Evpatoria Pushkin Theater
 "Golden key" Children's Theater Complex
 Puppet Theater-Studio "Marionetky"
 Theater of choreographic miniatures
 Gender interactive theater
 Fire Theater "Wolfram"
 Living Sculpture Theater
 Stilts Theater
 Dance theater of the peoples of the world

Kerch 

 Kerch Drama Theater named after Pushkin

Feodosia 

 Feodosia Drama Theatre

Yalta 

 Yalta Theater named after A.P. Chekhov

Vinnytsia Oblast

Vinnytsia 

 Vinnytsia Regional Academic Ukrainian Music and Drama Theater named after Mykola Sadovsky
 Vinnytsia Academic Regional Puppet Theater "Golden Key"

Volyn Oblast

Lutsk 

 Volyn Regional Academic Music and Drama Theater named after Taras Shevchenko
 Volyn Academic Regional Puppet Theater

Dnipropetrovsk Oblast

Dnipro 

 Dnipropetrovsk Academic Opera and Ballet Theater
 Dnieper Academic Ukrainian Music and Drama Theater named after Taras Shevchenko
 Dnipro Academic Drama and Comedy Theater
 Kryk Theatre
 Dnipropetrovsk City Puppet Theater
 Dnipropetrovsk Regional Youth Theater
 Dnipropetrovsk City Youth Theater-Studio "Virymo!"
 Dnipropetrovsk City Teleteatr
 Dnipropetrovsk City Theater "KVN DGU"

Kamianske 

 Lesia Ukrainka Academic Music and Drama Theater in Kamianske

Kryvyi Rih 

 Kryvyi Rih Drama and Musical Comedy Theater named after Taras Shevchenko
 Kryvyi Rih City Puppet Theater
 Kryvyi Rih Theater of Music and Plastic Arts "Academy of Movement"
 "AVE" Theater

Pavlohrad 

 Pavlograd Drama Theater named after B.E. Zakhava

Nikopol 

 Nikopol Ukrainian Folk Music and Drama Theater

Donetsk Oblast

Donetsk 

 Donetsk State Academic Opera and Ballet Theatre named after A. Solovianenko
 Donetsk National Academic Ukrainian Musical and Drama Theatre
 Donetsk Academic Regional Puppet Theater

Mariupol 

 Donetsk Regional Drama Theatre

Horlivka 

 Horlivka Ukrainian State Drama Theater
 Horlivka City Puppet Theater

Makiivka 

 Donetsk Regional Russian Theater for Young Spectators

Zhytomyr Oblast

Zhytomyr 

 Zhytomyr Theater named after Ivan Kocherga
 Zhytomyr Academic Regional Puppet Theater

Zviahel 

 Zviahel People's Amateur Theater
 Zviahel People's Youth Theater

Zakarpattia Oblast

Uzhhorod 

 Zakarpatsky Academic Regional Ukrainian Music and Drama Theater
 Transcarpathian Regional Puppet Theater "Bavka"

Mukachevo 

 Mukachevo Drama Theater

Zaporizhzhia Oblast

Zaporizhzhia 

 Zaporizhzhia Academic Regional Ukrainian Music and Drama Theater named after Volodymyr Magar
 Zaporizhzhia Academic Youth Theater
 Zaporizhzhia Regional Puppet Theater
 Zaporizhzhia Municipal Theater-Laboratory "VIE"
 Zaporizhzhia Municipal Dance Theater
 Zaporizhzhia Children's Theater "SVIYA"

Ivano-Frankivsk Oblast

Horodenka 
 Horodenka Theater SUCHASNYK

Ivano-Frankivsk 

 Ivan Franko National Academic Music and Drama Theatre
 Ivano-Frankivsk Academic Regional Puppet Theater named after Mariika Pidhirianka

Kolomyia 

 Kolomyia Academic Regional Ukrainian Drama Theater named after Ivan Ozarkevych

Kyiv Oblast

Bila Tserkva 

 Kyiv Academic Regional Music and Drama Theater named after P.K. Saksagansky

Kirovohrad Oblast

Kropyvnytskyi 

 Kirovohrad Academic Ukrainian Music and Drama Theater named after ML Kropyvnytskyi
 Kirovohrad Regional Academic Puppet Theater

Luhansk Oblast

Luhansk 

 Luhansk Academic Regional Russian Drama Theater
 Luhansk Academic Regional Puppet Theater

Sievierodonetsk 

 Luhansk Regional Academic Ukrainian Music and Drama Theater
 Severodonetsk City Drama Theater

Milove 

 Luhansk Regional Cossack Equestrian Theater

Lviv Oblast

Lviv 

 Lviv Theatre of Opera and Ballet
 Maria Zankovetska Theatre
 Les Kurbas Theatre
 Lviv Regional Puppet Theater
 Lviv Academic Drama Theater named after Lesia Ukrainka
 Lviv Academic Theater "Voskresinnia"
 First Ukrainian theater for children and youth
 Theater-studio "Pid mostom"
 "Ne zhurysʹ!" Theater
 Theater-studio "I Liudy, I Lialʹky"

Drohobych 

 Lviv Regional Academic Music and Drama Theater named after Yuri Drohobych

Chervonohrad 

 Chervonohrad Drama Theater named after Lesia Ukrainka
 Chervonohrad Theater-Studio "Fantasy"
 Chervonohrad Children's Theater "Fairy Tale"

Mykolaiv Oblast

Mykolaiv 

 Mykolaiv Academic Ukrainian Drama and Musical Comedy Theater
 Mykolaiv Academic Art Theatre of Drama
 Mykolaiv State Puppet Theatre

Odesa Oblast

Odesa 

 Odesa Opera and Ballet Theatre
 Odesa Academic Ukrainian Music and Drama Theater named after V. Vasylko
 Odesa Academic Theater of Musical Comedy named after M. Vodiany
 Odesa Regional Puppet Theater
 Odesa Oblast Academic Drama Theater
 Odesa Theater for Young Spectators named after M. Ostrovsky
 Theater on Tea House Street

Poltava Oblast

Полтава 

 Poltava Academic Regional Ukrainian Music and Drama Theater named after Mykola Gogol
 Poltava Academic Regional Puppet Theater

Rivne Oblast

Rivne 

 Rivne Regional Academic Ukrainian Music and Drama Theater
 Rivne Academic Regional Puppet Theater

Sumy Oblast

Sumy 

 Sumy National Academic Drama and Musical Comedy Theater named after M.S. Shchepkin
 Sumy Regional Theater for Children and Youth

Ternopil Oblast

Ternopil 

 Ternopil Academic Regional Drama Theater named after T.G. Shevchenko 
 Ternopil Regional Academic Actor and Puppet Theatre

Pidhaitsi 
 Pidhaietskyi Amateur Theater

Chortkiv 
 People's Amateur Theater

Kopychyntsi 
 Kopychyntsi National Theater named after Bohdan Lepky

Kremenets 
 People's Amateur Theater at the House of Culture

Buchach 
 People's Amateur Theater at the House of Culture

Nove Selo 
 People's Amateur Theater at the House of Culture

Terebovlia 
 People's Amateur Theater of Miniatures of Terebovlia Higher School of Culture

Shumsk 
 People's Amateur Theater of the Shumsky Regional House of Culture

Golgocha 
 Golgochansky People's Amateur Theater Collective

Kharkiv Oblast

Kharkiv 

 Kharkiv National Academic Opera and Ballet Theater named after Mykola Lysenko
 Kharkiv Ukrainian Drama Theatre
 Kharkiv State Academic Drama Theater
 Kharkiv State Academic Puppet Theater named after V.A. Afanasiev
 Kharkiv Academic Theater of Musical Comedy
 Kharkiv Theater for Children and Youth
 Theatre 19
 Kharkiv Theater "P.S."
 Maria Kovalenko Theater
 Theater Na Zhukah
 "Pari-Komik"
 New Theater
 Publicist Theater
 Amadeus Theater
 "Aparte" Theater
 Theater for people
 Kotelok Theater
 "Maybe" Theatre
 Poetry and music theater
 "Del Piero" French Comedy Theater
 "Stupeni" Theater-Studio
 Neft Theater

Kherson Oblast

Kherson 

 Kherson Regional Academic Music and Drama Theater named after Mykola Kulish
 Kherson Regional Puppet Theater

Khmelnytskyi Oblast

Khmelnytskyi 

 Khmelnytski Regional Ukrainian Music and Drama Theater named after Mykhailo Starytsky
 Khmelnytski Academic Regional Puppet Theater
 Khmelnytsky Monotheater "Kut"

Cherkasy Oblast

Cherkasy 

 Cherkasy Academic Regional Ukrainian Music and Drama Theater named after Taras Shevchenko
 Cherkasy Academic Puppet Theater

Chernivtsi Oblast

Chernivtsi 

 Chernivtsi Music and Drama Theater named after Olha Kobylianska
 Chernivtsi Academic Regional Puppet Theater

Chernihiv Oblast

Chernihiv 

 Chernihiv Regional Academic Ukrainian Music and Drama Theater named after Taras Shevchenko
 Chernihiv Regional Puppet Theater named after Dovzhenko
 Chernihiv Regional Youth Theater

Nizhyn 

 Nizhyn Academic Ukrainian Drama Theater named after M. Kotsyubynsky

See also 
 Theater in Ukraine
 Theatre of Coryphaei

References

External links 
 Каталог театрів України на Igotoworld.com
 Ukrainian Soviet Encyclopedia: у 12 т. / гол. ред. М. П. Бажан ; редкол.: О. К. Антонов та ін. — 2-ге вид. — К. : Головна редакція УРЕ, 1974–1985.
 Театри опери та балету на Офіційний веб-сайт 
 Музично-драматичні театри на Офіційний веб-сайт 
 Луганські обласні театри на Офіційна веб-сторінка Управління культури і туризму Луганської обласної державної адміністрації
 Театральна Миколаївщина на Веб-сторінка Миколаївської обласної бібліотеки для дітей імені В. Лягіна
 Театри Луганська на www.relax.lg.ua («Відпочинок у Луганську»)
 Шелест Наталя Культура Дніпропетровська на www.internet-centr.dp.ua
 Театральне мистецтво у Дніпропетровській області на Офіційний веб-сайт 
 Театри Криму на www.crimea-kurort.com (інфо-вебресурс «Крим курортний») 
 Кінотеатри і театри Євпаторії на evpatoriya.ru

Further reading 
 Архітектура українського театру. Простір і дія / В. І. Проскуряков; Нац. ун-т «Львів. політехніка». — 2-е вид., виправл. і доповн. — Л. : Срібне слово, 2004. — 583 c. — Бібліогр.: с. 544–572.
 Закарпатський театр на порозі ХХІ століття / С. Федака. – Ужгород : Ліра, 2018. – 264 с. 

 
Ukraine
Performing arts venues in Ukraine
Lists of buildings and structures in Ukraine
Lists of tourist attractions in Ukraine
Theatres